Walter Nelson-Rees (11 January 1929 – 23 January 2009) was a cell culture worker and cytogeneticist who helped expose the problem of cross-contamination of cell lines. He used chromosome banding to show that many immortal cell lines, previously thought to be unique, were actually HeLa cell lines. The HeLa cells had contaminated and overgrown the other cell lines.

Biography
He was born on January 11, 1929. Nelson-Rees retired in 1980. In 2005 he received the Lifetime Achievement Award, from the Society for In Vitro Biology (SIVB).

He died on January 23, 2009, in San Francisco, California, from complications from a broken hip.

References

Cell biology
1929 births
2009 deaths
Cell biologists